The Graceville Oilers were a Minor League Baseball team that represented the city of Graceville, Florida. They played in the Alabama–Florida League from 1947 to 1958. They were based in Enterprise, Alabama, and known as the Enterprise Boll Weevils until they moved to Graceville during the 1952 season.

References

External links
Baseball Reference Graceville
Baseball Reference Enterprise

Baseball teams established in 1936
Defunct minor league baseball teams
Professional baseball teams in Alabama
Defunct Alabama State League teams
Defunct Alabama-Florida League teams
Defunct baseball teams in Florida
Baseball teams disestablished in 1958
Cincinnati Reds minor league affiliates
1936 establishments in Alabama
1958 disestablishments in Florida
Jackson County, Florida